Cassin Abbas (28 March 1926 – 10 December 1982) was an Indonesian film actor and film editor. Born in Semarang, he became a Sergeant Major in the Indonesian army. He appeared in films such as Tamu Agung (1955), Five Deadly Angels (1980), and Bila hati perempuan menjerit (1981). Towards the end of his life he took to editing films.

References

External links

Indonesian male film actors
Indonesian film editors
1926 births
1982 deaths
People from Semarang
20th-century Indonesian male actors
Indonesian military personnel